Dial 'M' for Monkey is the second studio album by the British electronic music artist Bonobo. It was released on 17 June 2003.

Track listing
All tracks written and performed by Bonobo.

The CD includes a QuickTime video of "Pick Up", an animated film with the accompaniment of track 6, produced by Conkerco.

Trivia
The track "Flutter" was the only single released along with the album, with B-sides: "Pick Up (Four Tet Mix)" and "Something (Longer)".

Use in Media
 The tracks "Pick Up" and "Flutter" from were featured in the snowboarding game SSX on Tour.
 The track "Flutter" was used for the 2007 CBC Television series jPod, based on the Douglas Coupland novel of the same name.
 The track "Flutter" was used by Film4 in May 2009 on their commercials advertising films that were to be aired.
 "Flutter" appeared on the 3rd episode of the Channel 4 sitcom Nathan Barley.
 The track "Wayward Bob" is featured in the 2003 film Gumball 3000: The Movie.
 The album title is a reference to the Cartoon Network show Dexter's Laboratory.

Awards

In 2012 it was awarded a double silver certification from the Independent Music Companies Association which indicated sales of at least 40,000 copies throughout Europe.

Release history

References

2003 albums
Bonobo (musician) albums
Ninja Tune albums